Claudio Ruccolo (born 10 January 1985), better known as Claudio Capéo, is a French singer and accordion player of Italian descent. He grew up in Cernay, Alsace.

Career

Early beginnings
He learned to play the accordion at the young age of six and took part in musical competitions. At age 16, he was part of a metal band and later in an African jazz band. Continuing his education, he passed the Brevet d'études professionnelles (BEP) and Certificat d'aptitude professionnelle (CAP) and worked as a carpenter and decorator for 71

2010–2015: El Vagabond, Miss Mondo and Mr Jack
But never leaving his passion for music, he formed with friends the Campéo band releasing two self-published music albums: El Vagabond (2010) and Miss Mondo (2012) promoting them in live performances in France and neighbouring countries. In 2015 he released the EP Mr Jack.

2016–present: The Voice and Claudio Capéo
In 2016, he took part in season 5 of the French talent competition The Voice: la plus belle voix. In the blind auditions, he sang "Chez Laurette" from Michel Delpech with only Florent Pagny turning his chair. As part of Team Pagny, on 26 March 2016, he performed "Mathilde" from Jacques Brel in a battle against teammate Laurent-Pierre Lecordier and was eliminated. Despite his early exit from the show, Capéo has proven very popular with the French public. Just after the show, he was contacted by Sébastien Saussez, director of the French record label Jo&Co and in 2016 released the self-titled debut album Claudio Capéo that topped the SNEP French Albums chart in its first week of release staying at number 1 for five consecutive weeks. The album was certified three times platinum with sales of 300,000 copies by the beginning of 2017. His debut single "Un homme debout" made it to number 6 on the French Singles Chart also charting in Belgium.

Discography

Albums

Extended plays

Singles

References

Notes

Sources

External links
Official website

French accordionists
1985 births
Living people
French people of Italian descent
People of Molisan descent
The Voice (franchise) contestants
People from Haut-Rhin
21st-century accordionists
21st-century French singers
21st-century French male singers